The Chase is a grade II listed building on Hadley Common road to the north of Chipping Barnet.

References

External links

Grade II listed buildings in the London Borough of Barnet
Houses in the London Borough of Barnet
Monken Hadley